Roland Graupner is an East German sprint canoer who competed in the late 1970s. He won two gold medals in the K-4 500 m event at the ICF Canoe Sprint World Championships, earning them in 1978 and 1979.

References

German male canoeists
Living people
Year of birth missing (living people)
ICF Canoe Sprint World Championships medalists in kayak